Todd Boonstra (born May 29, 1961) is a former American cross-country skier. He competed in the Olympics in 1984, 1988, 1994. Boonstra is a 1984 graduate of the University of Vermont, where he competed for the Vermont Catamounts team. He is also a marathon runner, and in 2003 became the oldest champion of the Mount Marathon Race at 41. Boonstra graduated from Burnsville High School in Burnsville, Minnesota in 1980. He currently resides in Alaska, living in Ninilchik in the summers and Galena in the winter, where he is a teacher and ski coach.

Cross-country skiing results
All results are sourced from the International Ski Federation (FIS).

Olympic Games

World Championships

World Cup

Season standings

References

External links
 Todd Boonstra at sports-reference.com

American male cross-country skiers
Olympic cross-country skiers of the United States
Cross-country skiers at the 1984 Winter Olympics
Cross-country skiers at the 1988 Winter Olympics
Cross-country skiers at the 1994 Winter Olympics
Universiade medalists in cross-country skiing
University of Vermont alumni
Vermont Catamounts skiers
Living people
1961 births
People from Kenai Peninsula Borough, Alaska
People from Yukon–Koyukuk Census Area, Alaska
Universiade bronze medalists for the United States
Competitors at the 1983 Winter Universiade